Vincenzo Iaquinta  (born 21 November 1979) is an Italian former professional footballer who played as a striker.

Prior to joining Juventus in 2007, he initially played for several smaller Italian clubs, and subsequently moved to Udinese in 2000, where he spent seven seasons, representing the club in the UEFA Champions League. After failing to make an appearance under new manager Antonio Conte during the first half of the 2011–12 season, in January 2012, he was sent on a half-season loan to Cesena; he returned to Juventus the following season, but once again made no appearances due to injury as the club won the league title; he subsequently retired from football in 2013.

Iaquinta played 40 matches for the Italy national football team between 2005 and 2010, scoring 6 goals. He was included in their squad which won the 2006 FIFA World Cup, as well as the team for the 2010 edition of the tournament, scoring a goal on each occasion; he also took part at the 2009 FIFA Confederations Cup with Italy.

Club career

Reggiolo
Iaquinta was born in Cutro, in the province of Crotone. Like many Calabrians in the 1980s, his parents migrated to Emilia-Romagna in Northern Italy for better job opportunities.  Iaquinta played with his brother in the lower divisions for Reggiolo for the 1996–1997 season, before transferring to Serie B club Calcio Padova in January 1998, after 33 appearances and 6 goals in his first professional season and a half.

Padova
Iaquinta moved to Padova in January 1998, a club where his future Juventus teammate and Italian legend Alessandro Del Piero thrived, but his spell with Padova was short-lived as after only 6 months, just 13 appearances and 3 goals, Iaquinta was surprisingly sold to Serie C1 club, Castel di Sangro Calcio.

Castel di Sangro
Following his short spell in the Serie B, Iaquinta went on to spend two seasons in the Italian Serie C1, with Castel di Sangro from 1998 and 2000. It was with his new club where Iaquinta established himself, making 52 appearances as he became a key part of the starting line-up, and netting 8 goals. Following several impressive performances, Iaquinta was signed by Udinese Calcio of Serie A.

Udinese
In June 2000, Udinese completed the signing of the young prospect and in his first season with the club, Iaquinta made 16 appearances and scored 2 goals. The following season, he made 26 appearances with 3 goals, before breaking into the starting eleven in his third season. He scored 8 goals in 28 appearances and the following season (2002–03), in which Udinese finished in 6th and qualified for the UEFA Cup. Iaquinta made 32 appearances and scored 11 goals during the 2003–2004 season, as his team again reached the UEFA Cup, this time in 7th.

During the 2004–05 season, he made 39 appearances and scored 15 goals, as Udinese came in fourth in Serie A and therefore qualified for the UEFA Champions League. That following season, Iaquinta made 34 appearances with 17 goals, including a hat-trick in his first UEFA Champions League group stage match against Panathinaikos. Although he refused to sign a contract extension at the start of the season, on 30 September he agreed terms for a further 3 years.
In his final season, 2006–07, he scored 14 goals for his club in 30 appearances, and formed a partnership with Antonio Di Natale. Following a string of impressive seasons with Udinese, he was signed by Juventus.

Juventus

Juventus signed Iaquinta on a five-year contract on 19 June 2007 for a fee of €11.3 million. (cash plus Michele Paolucci), to become the Turin giant's first signing for the new campaign. Udinese also bought back Fabio Quagliarella from Sampdoria on 21 June; Sampdoria then bought Andrea Caracciolo from Palermo on 22 June and Palermo bought Fabrizio Miccoli from Juventus on 5 July.

During the 2007–08 season, Iaquinta made only a handful of starts for Juventus, mostly being used as back-up to the experienced strike partners Alessandro Del Piero and David Trezeguet, who combined to score 41 goals between them in the Serie A alone. He did however still manage 29 appearances with 9 often crucial goals, such as his last minute winner versus Napoli in April 2008. It appeared that he might be surplus to requirements after the signing of Brazilian striker Amauri, leading to rumours about a possible move out of Juventus. However, nothing materialised, and Iaquinta remained for the 2008–09 season. Iaquinta also signed a new 4-year contract near the end of 2008–09 season.

Iaquinta started the season as fourth-choice striker, but enjoyed a particularly impressive string of performances when both Amauri and Trezeguet were injured, gaining a more regular place under Claudio Ranieri. Most notably, he scored the first goal against Chelsea in the second leg of the first knockout stage of the UEFA Champions League, which was also Juventus' 600th goal in European competition. Despite this, Juve could only draw the match 2–2, and were eliminated. After that, Iaquinta also played regularly in Serie A games, his situation helped by a falling-out between Trezeguet and head coach Claudio Ranieri. In his second season in Piedmont, the striker managed 38 appearances with 16 goals. Following the sacking of Ranieri, and the appointment of Ciro Ferrara for the 2009–10 season, Iaquinta became an undisputed starter, before a major injury side-lined him for 6 months between October 2009 and March 2010. In 2010–11 Serie A, Juventus renewed its squad by selling Trezeguet but also signing Quagliarella. That season Iaquinta made only 8 starts (7 in first half season). Despite the injury of Quagliarella in mid-season, the arrival of Alessandro Matri made Iaquinta was a substitute in the second half of season.

Under new coach Antonio Conte in 2011, Iaquinta, Amauri and Luca Toni did not play a single minute on the pitch and Iaquinta was the third one to leave Turin on 31 January.

Cesena loan and Juventus return
On 31 January 2012, Iaquinta joined Cesena on loan until the end of the 2011–12 season. He made his debut for them on 9 February away at Lazio, and assisted Adrian Mutu for the first goal and scored a penalty to put Cesena 2–0 up at half-time, but they eventually lost 3–2. In total he made 7 appearances for the club, although his time with Cesena was once again characterised by injuries, and he was unable to save the club from relegation.

At the end of the season he returned to his home club Juventus, who had just won the league title, although he continued to struggle with injuries, and once again failed to make a single appearance under Conte during the 2012–13 Serie A season, as Juventus won a second consecutive league title. On 22 July 2013, following the end of his contract with the club, he announced his retirement, stating his intention to pursue a coaching career.

International career
Iaquinta made his international debut for Italy on 30 March 2005, as a half-time substitute for Luca Toni in a 0–0 home friendly draw against Iceland at the Stadio Euganeo in Padua.

Iaquinta was a member of the Italian squad that won the 2006 FIFA World Cup under manager Marcello Lippi. His first international goal came in his nation's opening match of the tournament, on 12 June: Iaquinta scored Italy's second goal in the 2–0 victory against Ghana. He played in 5 out of 7 of Italy's matches, including the victorious semi-final against hosts Germany and final against France on 9 July, in which he came on after 61 minutes for Simone Perrotta. Iaquinta missed out on Roberto Donadoni's Italy squad for Euro 2008 due to injury. He later took part at the 2009 FIFA Confederations Cup, and he also played for Italy in the 2010 FIFA World Cup, in which he scored a penalty in a 1–1 draw against New Zealand in the second group match. His 40th and final international appearance came in the last group game on 24 June, in which Italy were defeated 3–2 by Slovakia and eliminated from the tournament. In total he only scored six goals for Italy.

Style of play
In his prime, Iaquinta was a tall, physically strong, opportunistic, and extremely fast striker, who excelled in the air and at finishing off chances inside the penalty area. Due to his great pace, athleticism, work-rate, tenacity, and good movement off the ball, he was also known for his ability to make attacking runs to beat the defensive line and either get on the end of his teammates' passes or provide depth and create space for his team; his speed and timing also made him a dangerous offensive threat on counter-attacks. Although his preferred role was that of a striker, he was a versatile forward who was capable of playing in several offensive positions, and was also used as a second striker, or as a winger. Due to his strength, he excelled at playing with his back to goal, and at holding the ball up for teammates. Iaquinta was often injury-prone throughout his career, which frequently limited his playing time.

Personal life
Iaquinta has been married to Arianna Cucinotta since 14 June 2003. He and his wife have four children, two sons and two daughters: Giuseppe, born on 17 December 2002, Edoardo, born on 28 June 2004, Carlotta, born on 20 May 2008, and Ginevra, born on 23 April 2015.

Criminal allegations and conviction
During the Aemilia antimafia investigation, on 4 February 2015 illegal weapons were found at Iaquinta's Quattro Castella home and his father Giuseppe's home. On 21 December 2015, they were both sent to trial for the illegal possession of firearms, aggravated by the aiding of the Calabrian Mafia organization 'Ndrangheta expand to Northern Italy, of which his father was charged with association with the 'Ndrangheta through the 'Ndrina of Nicolino Grande Aracri. On 31 October 2018, Iaquinta was found guilty of illegal possession of firearms, and sentenced to two years imprisonment; his father was found guilty of mafia association, and received 19 years imprisonment.

Career statistics

Club
Source:

International
Source:

International goals
Scores and results list Italy's goal tally first.

|-
| 1. || 12 June 2006 || FIFA WM Stadion Hannover, Hanover, Germany ||  || align=center | 2–0 || align=center | 2–0 || 2006 FIFA World Cup
|-
| 2. || 1 April 2009 || Stadio San Nicola, Bari, Italy ||  || align=center | 1–0 || align=center | 1–1 || 2010 FIFA World Cup qualification
|-
| 3. || rowspan=2| 10 June 2009 || rowspan=2| Atteridgeville Super Stadium, Pretoria, South Africa || rowspan=2|  || align=center | 3–3 || rowspan=2 align=center | 4–3 || rowspan=2| Friendly
|-
| 4. || align=center | 4–3
|-
| 5. || 9 September 2009 || Stadio Olimpico, Turin, Italy ||  || align=center | 2–0 || align=center | 2–0 || 2010 FIFA World Cup qualification
|-
| 6. || 20 June 2010 || Mbombela Stadium, Nelspruit, South Africa ||  || align=center | 1–1 || align=center | 1–1 || 2010 FIFA World Cup
|-
|}

Honours

Club
Juventus
Serie A: 2012–13

International
Italy
FIFA World Cup: 2006

Individual
Coppa Italia top-scorer: 2007–08

Orders
  CONI: Golden Collar of Sports Merit: 2006

  4th Class / Officer: Ufficiale Ordine al Merito della Repubblica Italiana: 2006

References

External links

FootballDatabase.com provides Iaquinta's profile and stats
Lega Serie A Profile 
FIGC Profile 

1979 births
Living people
Sportspeople from the Province of Crotone
Italian footballers
Association football forwards
Italy international footballers
Italy under-21 international footballers
Italy youth international footballers
A.S.D. Castel di Sangro Calcio players
Calcio Padova players
Udinese Calcio players
Juventus F.C. players
A.C. Cesena players
Serie A players
Serie B players
Serie C players
2006 FIFA World Cup players
2009 FIFA Confederations Cup players
FIFA World Cup-winning players
2010 FIFA World Cup players
Officers of the Order of Merit of the Italian Republic
Footballers from Calabria
Sportspeople from the Province of Reggio Emilia
Footballers from Emilia-Romagna